The Shelton family is a family that was once prominent in the English gentry, and based in Norfolk. Their family seat was Shelton Hall. 

John De Shelton, the first Lord of the Manor, was born c. 1140. It is said that Nicholas De Shelton was among those barons presenting Magna Carta to King John, while Sir Ralph Shelton was knighted for his services to Edward III at the Battle of Crecy (1346). In the Tudor period Sir John Shelton, the twenty-first Lord of the Manor, and his wife Anne Boleyn were entrusted with the custody of Princess Mary and Princess Elizabeth as children, partly because Anne was the aunt of Queen Anne Boleyn and the mother of Mary Shelton, the mistress of Henry VIII during his marriage to Anne. They reached the peak of their influence during the Tudor period, when Mary Shelton became the mistress of Henry VIII.

References

Kelly Hart, The Mistresses of Henry VIII

 
English gentry families
People from South Norfolk (district)